Still Game is a Scottish  sitcom, produced by The Comedy Unit with BBC Scotland. It was created by Ford Kiernan and Greg Hemphill, who played the lead characters, Jack Jarvis, Esq and Victor McDade, two Glaswegian pensioners. The characters first appeared in the pair's previous TV sketch show Chewin' the Fat, which aired in Scotland from January 1999 until December 2005.

Following its debut on 6 September 2002, 62 episodes of Still Game were aired, including Christmas and Hogmanay specials, in addition to almost 50 live shows. The first three series were broadcast only on BBC One Scotland, though five episodes selected from the first two series were later broadcast throughout the UK on BBC Two from January to February 2004. From the fourth series, Still Game was broadcast across the UK on BBC Two. The show suddenly seemed to have stop creating episodes after season 6 due to the fact that the two creators had gotten into an argument and decided to go their separate ways for many years. The two would eventually get back together to make the seventh series in 2016, the programme began to be broadcast on BBC One.

It was announced on 13 July 2018 that a ninth and final series would be produced later in the year which would see the characters go into "comedy retirement". The last day of production was on 14 September 2018, and it started airing on 24 February 2019, being one of the first programmes to be shown on the brand new BBC Scotland channel.

History

Still Game started as a stage play featuring three characters: Jack Jarvis, Victor McDade, and Winston Ingram. Due to a broken lift, the three men are stranded in Victor's flat and discuss a variety of subjects ranging from death to sex. The stage play toured Scotland, England, Ireland and Canada before returning to Glasgow, where the show was filmed at the Cottiers Theatre in 1999 and released on video on 22 November 1999. A DVD of the show was later released on 2 December 2002. It is available on YouTube, as of January 2022.

A small number of revisions accompanied Still Game'''s transition from stage to television. Gavin Mitchell, who originally played Winston (and was replaced by Paul Riley for later performances), played the part of Boabby in the series. Characters mentioned in passing were later fleshed out into supporting characters.

In 1998, Jack and Victor appeared in a number of skits in a tongue-in-cheek documentary about Scottish pop music called Och Around the Clock. In these, they are shown to be watching while sitting in Victor's flat. Their skits centred on the duo's disparaging comments about the performers.

The characters reappeared in Kiernan and Hemphill's sketch show Chewin' the Fat, nearly every episode of which featured Jack, Victor, Tam and Winston, with minor differences from their counterparts in the series. By the time Still Game became a show in its own right Winston's physical appearance had changed significantly, but he was still played by Paul Riley. As the show evolved, supporting characters assumed greater prominence. Jack and Victor made their final appearance on Chewin' the Fat in the 2002 Hogmanay Special.

For the show's first three series, the broadcast of Still Game was limited to BBC One Scotland. The show was then moved to BBC Two for the fourth series and shown throughout the UK. On 28 December 2005, the first Christmas special was shown on BBC One, the first national broadcast of the show on the channel. A fifth series of the show started filming in February 2006 and was shown the following June on BBC Two. As of 2006, series three had not been shown nationally, and only five episodes from the first two series were shown on national BBC Two from 17 January to 14 February 2004. The second series was shown nationally from 10 July 2008. This meant it was listed as a new series in TV listings, even though it was not for Scottish viewers.

In the first three series, the episode titles were all Glaswegian dialect words that were related to the episode. Starting from series four, the episodes were titled using standard English, so that general audiences could understand them.

The events of Still Game take place in a floating timeline where the characters remain the same age from series to series. One of the most prominent examples of this is that Victor reveals that he is 74 years old in "Scran", an episode of the second series, but it is not until the fifth series ("Smoke on the Water") that he celebrates his 75th birthday.

The sixth series of Still Game ended on BBC Two on 23 August 2007. A Christmas special was aired on BBC One Scotland on 23 December and for the rest of the UK on BBC Two on 28 December. There was also a Hogmanay special called "Hootenanny" aired on BBC One Scotland, later aired to the rest of the UK on 2 January 2008.

Ford Kiernan, Greg Hemphill and Paul Riley's company Effingee Productions is thought to have split up after Riley walked away to go it alone after being refused more control over the future of the company by Kiernan. Hemphill stated that he didn't want a "boardroom battle". The split ultimately resulted in the indefinite hiatus of the series.

In 2012 actor and playwright Kenny Boyle acquired the rights to the original stage play of Still Game and toured the show, with a new cast, to The Tron theatre, FTH theatre, and The Ayr Gaiety Theatre. The original play hadn’t been staged for 14 years. Kiernan and Hemphill came to see the performances and consequently began considering reviving Still Game officially.

On 15 October 2013, the Daily Record ran a front-page story that the show would be returning. On 23 October 2013, Ford Kiernan and Greg Hemphill announced details of live shows entitled  Still Game Live at The SSE Hydro in Glasgow at a press conference. They were scheduled to perform four shows beginning in September 2014, but due to high demand, it was extended to 16 and then 21 shows. On 24 October 2013 Kiernan confirmed in the Daily Record that Kenny Boyle’s tour of the original stage show had been one of the instigating factors for Still Game’s return.

The 21 shows at The Hydro ran from 19 September 2014 until 10 October 2014, played to 210,000 fans and made £6,000,000 in ticket sales. The show received mixed reviews.

In November 2014, a special sketch featuring Jack and Victor visiting the set of River City was made for Children in Need. The sketch also featured a cameo of a director played by Still Game director Michael Hines. On Hogmanay 2014, BBC Scotland showed a documentary celebrating the show titled Still Game: The Story So Far. The programme featured interviews with the cast, celebrities who have appeared on the show and super fans, including a look at some favourite moments.

On 12 May 2016, the BBC announced that the show would return in 2016 with a six-part seventh series, nine years after the previous series concluded. Filming of the new seventh series started in the summer and the series began on 7 October 2016. The show's return attracted its highest ever overnight audience for a single episode on 7 October, taking a 58% share of the Scottish TV audience with 1,300,000 viewers. The show also aired for the first time on BBC One across the UK nationwide and drew a total audience of 3,200,000.

In September 2016, a second live show Still Game Live 2: Bon Voyage was announced for the SSE Hydro. The second stage show was to run for ten nights beginning 4 February 2017, but in October 2016, a further five performances were added. Unlike the previous live show, this show was not televised or recorded in any other way.

On 16 March 2017, it was announced that an eighth series has been commissioned to air on BBC One with plans to broadcast towards the end of 2017. The series was pushed back to start on 8 March 2018.

Before the start of the eighth series, Hemphill revealed that he and Kiernan were about to start writing the ninth series and plan to do a third and final live show after that.

On 13 July 2018, the BBC announced that Still Game would return for the ninth and final series later in 2019, after which the show will end. Filming for the ninth series started in August 2018 and was completed on 14 September 2018.

The third and final SSE Hydro live show Still Game: The Final Farewell was officially announced on 1 November 2018, with five shows in September 2019 taking place over three days. A further 5 shows were announced on 2 November.

Series and episodes

Cast

Main cast
 Ford Kiernan as Jack Jarvis Esq. 
 Greg Hemphill as Victor McDade
 Paul Riley as Winston Ingram
 Mark Cox as Thomas "Tam" Mullen
 Jane McCarry as Isa Drennan
 Sanjeev Kohli as Navid Harrid
 Gavin Mitchell as Robert "Boabby The Barman" Taylor

Recurring cast
 Shamshad Akhtar as Meena Harrid
 James Martin as "Auld" Eric (Jones)
 Paul Young as Hugh "Shug" McLaughlin
 Jake D'Arcy as Peter "Pete the Jakey" McCormack
 Matt Costello as Stevie "The Bookie" Reid 
 Lynne McCallum as Peggy McAlpine
 Sandy Nelson as Chris "The Postie" Armstrong
 Kate Donnelly as Frances Mullen
 Maureen Carr as Edith
 Jamie Quinn as Derek "Fergie the Ned" Ferguson
 Scott Reid as Michael "Methadone Mick" Doherty
 Marj Hogarth as Fiona Jarvis
 Bruce Morton as Ian Duncan Sheathing (and Doctor in previous episodes) 

Filming locationsStill Game is set in the fictional Craiglang area of Glasgow, and the Maryhill district of the city is a popular filming location. The early part of the first episode "Flittin" was filmed in the South Nitshill area of Glasgow, where Jack lived before he moved into the flat next-door to Victor at Osprey Heights. The block of flats which was used to film Osprey Heights can be found at Collina Street in the Maryhill area of Glasgow. The shops featured in the series can be found in the Townhead area of Glasgow. The Forth and Clyde Canal and its locks are used in background shots, along with the nearby high-rise tower blocks (flats) including the one used for Osprey Heights. For the first three series of the show, a pub ("The Gimlet") in Ruchill served as the set exterior of the Clansman pub. Between series three and four, the building owner had it demolished. A reproduction exterior set was constructed by the production team in the Glasgow North Media Park, Maryhill for filming starting with the fourth series. An outdoor market in Possilpark was used in the episode "Cauld" when Winston buys several electric heaters. The bingo scene in "Courtin" was filmed at the Gala Bingo hall in Possilpark and was a scene that coincidentally brought two old friends together, as Paul Riley (Winston) and Joe Houston (the Gala Bingo caller featured in filming); were friends in their youth. Scene interiors (Jack and Victor's flats, hallways and the interior of Harrid's) were constructed sets in a warehouse of a complex now a Maryhill industrial estate and part of Craigmont Studios). Scenes from several episodes were also filmed in the Knightswood area of Glasgow, including exterior scenes in the episode "Courtin", and the golf course scenes in the episode "Tappin".

Finport, as mentioned and seen in the fifth series, was filmed on location in Largs and Saltcoats, North Ayrshire, both of which were once popular seaside resorts with Glaswegians. The shots of the promenade and the sea wall is that of Saltcoats' harbour area. The café that Jack and Victor walk past is The Melbourne Café in Saltcoats. The pub scene is set in the Royal Oak pub in Largs, while the bed and breakfast where Jack and Victor stay overnight is located at the north end of Largs promenade. In the scene where Jack and Victor arrive on the bus from the right in Finport, this leads from the sea, as there is no road there. In the scene where Jack and Victor find Winston, a wide panning shot reveals the famous Nardini's ice-cream building and the Caledonian MacBrayne ferry to Millport.

Ardgowan House, a late eighteenth-century mansion at Inverkip, Inverclyde, was used as the setting for Blairtunnoch in the episode "Fly Society". Jack and Victor buy tickets for a meal and evening at the theatre from Tam who won them in a radio quiz. During the pre-theatre meal, they meet two apparently sophisticated, attractive ladies, played by Una McLean and Jeannie Fisher, whom they try to impress with tall tales of overseas adventures and wealth: the women thus invite them to a country house party at Blairtunnoch.

The area where Jack and Victor are sitting during the court recess in the episode "Recipe" of series six is the Main Lounge of The Crookston Hotel in Glasgow. The interior shots of the bakery in the same episode "Recipe" were filmed at factories in Glasgow, one of which Tunnocks factory in Uddingston (the baker at the start of this episode is also the Tunnocks baker in Uddingston) and also Pars Foods for the production line scene with Winston.The court scenes were filmed in Court No. 2 of Hamilton Sheriff Court.

The bar used during the Hogmanay Special in 2007, Hootenanny, was The Red Hoose in Dunipace, chosen by producers for its old world qualities.

Navid's shop interior was a set in Hillington industrial estate, the exterior shots being a row of shops in Kennedy Path, Townhead, Glasgow.

The shots where Jack and Victor visit Barbara at her workplace were filmed in Clydebank, a town 8 miles west of Glasgow. The interior of the shop was also filmed on site in a local charity shop which is still in use today.

Just before the fifth series started filming, a pest control team had to be called into the Maryhill studio set when it was discovered that rats had infested Navid's shop and were eating their way through the stock. The alarm was raised after Jane McCarry (Isa) found a dead rat on the set. The high rat population in the area was due to the proximity of the Forth and Clyde Canal.

The Children In Need sketch was filmed on the River City set at the BBC Scotland studios in Dumbarton, Scotland, as was much of the seventh series.

The theme music used on the TV broadcasts of the show is an excerpt from "Cuban Boy", as recorded by The Cuban Boys, which is itself based on a sample of Frank Chacksfield's track of the same name from the album West of Sunset. The opening and ending theme tune was changed to an entirely different theme on the BBC DVD and Netflix releases: the reason behind this is still unexplained, however licensing could be a possibility. The BBC Scottish Symphony Orchestra recorded an updated version of the theme tune for Series 7, which is also used on the DVD release of that series.

Awards

DVD releases

Critical response

Referring to the fifth series' finale, Scottish tabloid newspaper the Daily Record heralded for Still Game to be added to the ranks of the "greatest sitcoms ever". They called the episode "classic comedy" and said it was "a perfect mix of empathetic friendship, laugh-out-loud gags, real feeling in the acting and genuine warmth and chemistry between the characters". The Daily Record also reported that Still Game had higher ratings than rival comedies The Catherine Tate Show and Steve Coogan's Saxondale with 300,000 and 700,000 more viewers respectively. Creator and star Ford Kiernan said of the ratings: "I am absolutely delighted. The figures have gradually increased – episode after episode."Still Game was criticised for its "reliance on expletives" by Teddy Jamieson, television critic for The Herald. He also commented that the sitcom "paints [Scotland] in broad strokes", through its use of stereotypes. TV Today praised the show for being "refreshing" in the age of dying sitcoms. It said the show was funny in a "straight down the line way". Still Game has attracted interest from known screen legends, such as Sean Connery (who even requested a role in the show). Actor Bill Nighy is also reported to be a fan, calling upon the distinct Glaswegian accent for his role as Davy Jones in Pirates of the Caribbean. The show has won awards in both the 2004 and 2005 BAFTA Scotland awards and was named as the winner in the Best Broadcast category at the 2004 Glenfiddich Spirit of Scotland Awards.

In 2006, Still Game was once again nominated for a BAFTA Scotland award for the "Most Popular Television" category. Other contenders included Rebus and Taggart. Paul Riley, who plays Winston, was also awarded for his role in the show.

The series revival in 2016 received some negative reviews. Julie McDowall, writing for The National, said of the first episode "You're going to hate me for saying this. I already hate myself for even daring to hold these thoughts, but I need to be honest with you: this was a disappointment." She later said of the series, "I fear this once brilliant sitcom is turning into Mrs. Brown's Boys. Just like an auld yin in The Clansman, its teeth have been removed and it’s gumsy and ineffectual and a bit of a bore." A review in Chortle said "I suspect a lot of new viewers will wonder what all the fuss is about, as this episode seems clunky and dated," going on to say "in truth no one here appears to be a great actor" and that "it seems to be a little crudely edited, too, with the timing of cutaways off the pace. And when you start to notice things like that, it’s got to be a sign that something’s wrong."

See also
List of Still Game episodes
List of Still Game charactersChewin' the Fat''

References

External links

Still Game at The Comedy Unit

Filming locations from Still Game

 
2002 Scottish television series debuts
2019 Scottish television series endings
2000s British sitcoms
2000s Scottish television series
2010s British sitcoms
2010s Scottish television series
BBC Scotland television shows
BBC television sitcoms
British television series revived after cancellation
English-language television shows
Maryhill
Scots-language mass media
Scottish satirical television shows
Scottish television sitcoms
Television series about old age
Television series by Banijay
Television series by BBC Studios
Television shows set in Glasgow